The Logbadjeck Formation, also known as the Mungo River Formation, is a Late Cretaceous geologic formation in Cameroon. It is Turonian to Campanian in age, and represents a marine depositional environment. Pterosaur fossils have been recovered from the formation.

See also 
 List of pterosaur-bearing stratigraphic units

References 

Geologic formations of Cameroon
Upper Cretaceous Series of Africa
Turonian Stage
Coniacian Stage
Santonian Stage
Campanian Stage
Shale formations
Limestone formations
Marl formations
Fossiliferous stratigraphic units of Africa
Paleontology in Cameroon